SS Galeka was a steam ship built in 1899 for the Union-Castle Mail Steamship Company by Harland and Wolff. She was launched on 21 October 1899 and completed on 23 December 1899. Later she was requisitioned for use as a British troop transport and then a hospital ship during the First World War. On 28 October 1916 she struck a mine laid by the German U-boat UC-26.

History
The ship was the last vessel to enter service before the merger between the Union and Castle shipping lines in 1900.  She served on the South Africa route until the First World War when she was used by the UK as a troop transport, carrying troops of the Australian and New Zealand Army Corps to the Gallipoli Campaign.  Galeka was then refitted as a hospital ship with accommodation for 366 wounded passengers.

Sinking

On 28 October 1916, while entering Le Havre, HMHS Galeka struck a mine. She was not carrying patients at the time, but 19 Royal Army Medical Corps personnel died in the sinking. She was beached at Cap la Hogue, but was a total loss, Union-Castle's first war casualty.

See also
 List of hospital ships sunk in World War I

References

World War I shipwrecks in the English Channel
Maritime incidents in 1916
Hospital ships in World War I
1899 ships
Ship names
Ships built in Belfast
Hospital ships of the Royal Navy
Ships sunk by German submarines in World War I
Ships of the Union-Castle Line
Ships sunk by mines
Ships built by Harland and Wolff